Bob Webb (13 September 1917 – 8 May 1989) was a New Zealand cricketer. He played in twelve first-class matches for Canterbury from 1937 to 1950.

See also
 List of Canterbury representative cricketers

References

External links
 

1917 births
1989 deaths
New Zealand cricketers
Canterbury cricketers
Cricketers from Christchurch